Charles Robley Evans (August 9, 1866 – November 30, 1954) was a United States representative from Nevada for one term.

Life

Evans served as a delegate for Nevada at the 1908 Democratic National Convention and gave his vote to William Jennings Bryan for president and initially supported Charles A. Towne for the vice presidency until his name was withdrawn and switched his support to John W. Kern. In 1916 he sold his saloon to focus on developing his mining company, Wall Street Copper, in Luning, Nevada.

On May 7, 1918, Evans wrote a letter to William McKnight, the Secretary of the Democratic State Central committee, announcing his candidacy for Nevada's congressional House seat. Shortly before the end of World War I he stated his support of continuing the war until Germany was completely defeated and turned into a republic. In 1920 he was defeated by Samuel S. Arentz, but remained in Washington, D.C. for a few years until moving to Miami, Florida and then returning to Nevada.

References

1866 births
1954 deaths
People from Sangamon County, Illinois
Democratic Party members of the United States House of Representatives from Nevada
Fellows of the American Physical Society